This is a list of recording artists who have reached number one on Billboard's Rhythmic chart. Billboard began ranking Rhythmic music in the issue dated October 3, 1992, based on weekly radio airplay as based on data from Nielsen Broadcast Data Systems.

 
 All acts are listed alphabetically.
 Solo artists are alphabetized by last name, groups by group name excluding "A," "An" and "The."
 Each act's total of number one Rhythmic hits is shown after their name.
 All artists who are mentioned in song credits are listed here; this includes one-time pairings of otherwise solo artists and those appearing as "featured".
 Many artists and producers use aliases and pseudonyms - this list shows whichever artist name was used on the record.
 Artists associated with a group who reached number one, yet have their own solo page in Wikipedia are not listed here, unless they hit number one as a solo artist.

0-9 
 2 Chainz (3) 
 6lack (1) 
 21 Savage (5) 
 24kGoldn (1) 
 50 Cent (8) 
 112 (2) 
 702 (1)

A 
 A Boogie wit da Hoodie (1) 
 Aaliyah (4) 
 Afrojack (2) 
 Christina Aguilera (3) 
 Jhené Aiko (4) 
 Akon (5) 
 Ali & Gipp (1) 
 All-4-One (2) 
 AlunaGeorge (1) 
 ASAP Rocky (1) 
 Ashanti (3) 
 Iggy Azalea (3)

B

C

D

E 
 E-40 (2)  
 Ella Mai (1) 
 Missy Elliott (3) 
 Eminem (6) 
 En Vogue (2) 
 Enya (1) 
 Faith Evans (1) 
 Eve (1)

F 
 Fabolous (2) 
 Far East Movement (1) 
 Fat Joe (1) 
 Fetty Wap (2) 
 Lupe Fiasco (1) 
 Field Mob (1) 
 Fifth Harmony (1) 
 Flo Rida (4) 
 Jamie Foxx (3) 
 The Fugees (1) 
 Future (4)

G 
 G-Eazy (2) 
 The Game (2) 
 Ginuwine (1) 
 Giveon (1) 
 GoonRock (1) 
 Ariana Grande (3) 
 Layton Greene (1) 
 Gucci Mane (3) 
 David Guetta (1) 
 Gunna (2)

H 
 Brandy "Ms. B" Hambrick (1) 
 Jack Harlow (3) 
 Calvin Harris (1) 
 H.E.R. (1) 
 Lauryn Hill (1) 
 Keri Hilson (1) 
 Whitney Houston (6) 
 Adina Howard (1)

I 
 Internet Money (1) 
 ILoveMakonnen (1) 
 Iyaz (1)

J

K

L

M

N 
 Nate Dogg (1) 
 Nav
 Nayer (1) 
 Nelly (7) 
 N.E.R.D (1) 
 Next (1) 
 Ne-Yo (7) 
 Nico & Vinz (1)

O 
 Offset (2) 
 Olivia (1) 
 Omarion (2) 
 OMI (1) 
 Rita Ora (1) 
 OutKast (2)

P

Q 
 Quavo (2)

R

S

T

U 
 Kali Uchis (1) 
 UGK (1) 
 Usher (13)

V 
 Vita (1)

W 

 Wale (1) 
 Paul Wall (1) 
 Wanz (1) 
 The Weeknd (14) 
 Kanye West (6) 
 Mario Winans (2) 
 will.i.am (1) 
 Wiz Khalifa (3)

X 
 Xscape (1)

Y 
 YG (3) 
 Young Berg (1) 
 Young Jeezy (1) 
 Young Money (1) 
 Young Thug (3) 
 Yung Bleu (1) 
 Yung Joc (4)

Z 
 Zacari (1) 
 Arizona Zervas (1)

References

Rhythmic